Aleksandr Petrovich Smirnov (born 12 April 1996) is a Russian football player who plays for FC Kuban Krasnodar.

Club career
He made his debut in the Russian Professional Football League for FSK Dolgoprudny on 10 April 2016 in a game against FC Znamya Truda Orekhovo-Zuyevo.

He made his Russian Football National League debut for FC Khimki on 29 July 2018 in a game against PFC Sochi.

On 4 August 2020, he signed with Russian Premier League club FC Rostov. He made his Russian Premier League debut for Rostov on 26 August 2020 in a game against FC Ural Yekaterinburg. On 28 September 2020, he joined FC Orenburg on loan.

On 16 June 2021, he moved to FC SKA-Khabarovsk on loan for the 2021–22 season. In January 2022, he moved to FC KAMAZ Naberezhnye Chelny on loan until the end of the 2021–22 season.

On 21 January 2023, Smirnov signed with Russian First League club FC Kuban Krasnodar.

Career statistics

References

External links
 
 
 

1996 births
People from Kirov Oblast
Living people
Russian footballers
Association football midfielders
FC Lokomotiv Moscow players
NK Novigrad players
FC Olimp-Dolgoprudny players
FC Khimki players
FC Rostov players
FC Orenburg players
FC SKA-Khabarovsk players
FC KAMAZ Naberezhnye Chelny players
FC Urozhay Krasnodar players
Russian Premier League players
Russian First League players
Russian Second League players
First Football League (Croatia) players
Russian expatriate footballers
Expatriate footballers in Croatia
Sportspeople from Kirov Oblast